Tom McKeown may refer to:

 Tom D. McKeown (1878–1951), U.S. Representative from Oklahoma
 Tom McKeown (poet) (born 1937), American poet